Count József Adolf Somssich de Saárd (9 December 1864 – 22 January 1941) was a Hungarian politician, who served as Minister of Foreign Affairs between 1919 and 1920. Until the First World War he worked for some of embassies (Genova, Berlin, Paris). Between 1920 and 1924 he served as ambassador to Vatican. Somssich was a member of the House of Magnates.

Somssich's wife was Countess Kamilla Szőgyény-Marich (1876–1966), a daughter of a former diplomat and minister Count László Szőgyény-Marich. Their wedding was held in Berlin in 1899, the event was also attended by the German Emperor William II. The marrying cleric was Sámuel Etyey, the Bishop of Pécs.

References

External links
 Magyar Életrajzi Lexikon

1864 births
1941 deaths
Politicians from Graz
People from the Duchy of Styria
Foreign ministers of Hungary
Hungarian people of the Hungarian–Romanian War
Ambassadors of Hungary to the Holy See